The sambai is a Creole fertility dance performed in Belize during the full moon, and during weddings or birthdays. It is a solitary dance that was originally performed by men but can now be performed by either gender.  The dancer enters a ring of drummers to dance, and when finished points to another person who dances next.

References

Latin dances
Central American culture